Kamalabad (also Romanized as Kamālābād) is a village in Kuhestan Rural District, in the Central District of Nain County, Isfahan Province, Iran. At the 2006 census, its population was 300, in 74 families.

References 

Populated places in Nain County